Newbury Township is one of eleven townships in LaGrange County, Indiana. As of the 2020 census, its population was 5,792, up from 5,219 at the previous census.

According to the 2020 "ACS 5-Year Estimates Data Profiles", 36.5% of the township's population spoke only English, while 63.4 spoke an "other [than Spanish] Indo-European language" (basically Pennsylvania German/German).

History
Newbury Township was organized in 1837.

The Menno Yoder Polygonal Barn was listed on the National Register of Historic Places in 1993.

Geography

Demographics

References

External links
 Indiana Township Association
 United Township Association of Indiana

Townships in LaGrange County, Indiana
Townships in Indiana
Populated places established in 1837
1837 establishments in Indiana